Kelvin Lamonta Kinney (born December 31, 1972) is a former American football defensive lineman.  His nickname is K2.

Kinney was a defensive end in the National Football League for the Washington Redskins.  He also has professional experience in the now defunct XFL (where he led the league in quarterback sacks) and the Canadian Football League. He played college football at Virginia State University.

References

External links

Columbus Destroyers' player page
AFL Stats
NFL.com player page

1972 births
Living people
American football defensive ends
American players of Canadian football
Canadian football defensive linemen
Columbus Destroyers players
Detroit Fury players
Edmonton Elks players
Las Vegas Outlaws (XFL) players
Players of American football from West Virginia
People from Montgomery, West Virginia
San Jose SaberCats players
Tampa Bay Storm players
Toronto Argonauts players
Virginia State Trojans football players
Washington Redskins players
Dallas Vigilantes players